Aemocia farinosa is a species of beetle in the family Cerambycidae. It was described by Francis Polkinghorne Pascoe in 1865. It is known from the  Molucca Islands.

References

Mesosini
Beetles described in 1865
Taxa named by Francis Polkinghorne Pascoe